List of migrant and refugee rescue ships operating in the Mediterranean Sea names selected ships run by NGOs taking part in the rescue of people endangered when attempting to migrate across the Mediterranean Sea to Europe. They were variously chartered, donated, or bought specifically for this purpose.

List 

This sortable table is by default listed in order of the vessels' names:

Further related facilities 
Since 2017, Sea-Watch have operated a SAR-coordinating reconnaissance aircraft, Moonbird, a single-engined Cirrus SR22, and since June 2020, also the Seabird, a twin-engined high-performance Beechcraft Baron 58. These are flown in cooperation with the Swiss NGO Humanitarian Pilots Initiative.

In December 2020, Association Pilotes Volontaires began operation of their Dyn'Aéro MCR4S reconnaissance aircraft named Colibri 2. Their original Colibri, of the same make, flew its first mission in May 2018. As of June 2019, they had logged 52 missions, sighting 54 boats and by their estimates saving more than 4,300 people.

Further related organisations 
For a period, the Search and Rescue Observatory for the Mediterranean (SAROBMED), based at Queen Mary University of London, monitored SAR operations in the region. SAROBMED in turn listed a number of other organisations, including (in addition to those mentioned above):
 Alarm Phone 
 Borderline Europe 
 Equal Rights 
 The AIRE Centre

In conjunction with Alarm Phone, Watch the Mediterranean Sea monitors deaths and violations of migrants' rights at the maritime borders of the EU via an online mapping platform.

The German-based international movement Seebrücke has campaigned since 2018 for the humanitarian rights for people to migrate.

Organisations with future plans 

As of May 2021, the Italian group 'RESQ (people saving people)' had been working on plans to fund and start operating a further rescue ship. In July 2021 they announced their acquisition of the Alan Kurdi, which was renamed ResQ PEOPLE; they began preparing the ship for new rescue operations. RESQ PEOPLE sailed from Borriana on 7 August 2021 to start rescue missions in the central Mediterranean.

See also
Environmental migrant
European migration crisis
List of migrant vessel incidents on the Mediterranean Sea

National and international operations
Operation Mare Nostrum
Operation Triton
Operation Themis
Operation Sophia

References 

Refugee rescue
Mediterranean refugee rescue ships
Mediterranean refugee rescue